Ascochyta viciae is an ascomycete fungus species in the genus Ascochyta.

Ascofuranone is an antibiotic first isolated from a strain of A. viciae in 1972; however, the identification of the strain is later revised as Acremonium sclerotigenum, and A. viciae cannot produce this antibiotic.

See also
List of Ascochyta species

References

viciae